Kay or Kaye Adams may refer to:

Kay Adams (singer) (born 1941), American country singer
Kay Adams-Corleone, fictional character in The Godfather
Kaye Adams (born 1962), Scottish television presenter
Kay Adams (sportscaster) (born 1986), American host of the NFL Network's Good Morning Football
Kay Adams (curler) (born 1987), Scottish curler